The Round Up is a 2010 French historical war drama film written and directed by Roselyne Bosch and produced by Alain Goldman. The film stars Mélanie Laurent, Jean Reno, Sylvie Testud and Gad Elmaleh. Based on the true story of a young Jewish boy, the film depicts the Vel' d'Hiv Roundup (Rafle du Vel' d'Hiv), the mass arrest of Jews by French police who were accomplices of Nazi Germans in Paris in July 1942.

Plot
Jo Weisman, a young Jewish Parisian, and his family are taken by the Germans and Vichy collaborators in the rafle du Vel' d'Hiv. Anna Traube, a 20-year-old woman, walks out of the velodrome with forged papers; her mother and sister are captured. Annette Monod, a Protestant nurse, volunteers for the velodrome, and assists Jewish doctor David Sheinbaum.  From the Vélodrome d'Hiver Jo's family and Sheinbaum are transferred to the Beaune-la-Rolande internment camp. Monod comes along. She does what she can to help the children, who are soon falling sick from the camp diet and conditions.

The parents are dispatched by train to supposed "work camps in the East" (in reality the extermination camps), and Sheinbaum too. Monod wants to come along, but Sheinbaum talks her out of it. After some time authorities announce that for humanitarian reasons the children will be reunited with their parents in the east (in reality the adults have already been killed in Auschwitz, and they are now going to kill the children). Some children believe they will rejoin their parents. However, Jo and another boy, Pavel, escape under barbed wire, taking money that the family had hidden in the toilets along with their valuables.

While the other children are being taken away, a doctor treats Monod, who is now sick herself. The doctor, a secret resister, has received word about the extermination camps and tells Monod. She races after the children despite her sick condition, but finds the train transporting the children to Auschwitz has just left. The same train passes by Jo and Pavel. Jo pauses to watch it in anger.

After the war, Monod searches for survivors at the Hôtel Lutetia. She finds Jo, who has survived and is to be adopted by a family, and a younger boy Noé, to whom she had also been close.  He had somehow slipped out of the group of children taken away on the train to Auschwitz.

Reality
The plot features several real people, including Jo Weisman and Anna Traube; in the film her mother and sister are captured, in real life they also escaped to join their father in Limoges. Another real character is Annette Monod. Dr. David Sheinbaum, played by Jean Reno, is a synthesis of more than one doctor.

Cast

Mélanie Laurent as Protestant nurse  (d. 1995)
Gad Elmaleh as Schmuel Weismann
Jean Reno as Dr. David Sheinbaum
 as Sura Weismann
Denis Menochet as Corot
Sylvie Testud as Bella Zygler
Adèle Exarchopoulos as Anna Traube (aged 20)
Catherine Allegret as the concierge Tati
Isabelle Gélinas as Hélène Timonier
Hugo Leverdez as young Jo Weismann (aged 11)
Jo Weisman (aged 80) as the old man
Oliver Cywie as Simon Zygler
Mathieu and Romain Di Concetto as Noé Zygler
Anne Brochet as Dina Traube
Barnabás Réti as Monsieur Goldstein
Thierry Frémont as Capitaine Pierret, fire chief
Catherine Hosmalin as The baker
Anne Benoît as Matthey Jouanis
Iván Fenyő as Gradé allemand Müller 
Armelle as School Nurses's Director
 as Adolf Hitler
Thomas Darchinger as Heinrich Himmler
Holger Daemgen as Helmut Knochen
Roland Copé as Marshal Philippe Pétain
 as Prime Minister Pierre Laval
Frederic Moulin as Laval's deputy, René Bousquet
Patrick Courtois as Emile Hennequin, Paris chief of police
Christelle Cornil as Jacqueline
Swann Arlaud as Weismann

Music
"Clair de lune" from Claude Debussy. 
"Valse N°17" from Frédéric Chopin. 
"Paris" from Edith Piaf. 
"Tombé du ciel" from Charles Trénet. 
"Insensiblement", and "Quand un Vicomte", from Ray Ventura. 
"Tout en flanant" from André Claveau. 
"La Savane" from Louis Moreau Gottschalk. 
"Concerto de L'adieu" from Georges Delerue. 
"Concerto pour Violon", from Philip Glass.

Production

Roselyne Bosch first decided to make a film of the events surrounding the rafle du Vel' d'Hiv because she felt sympathy with the victims. Her husband's family is Jewish and lived in Montmartre near where the Weismann family lived. Her father had been detained in one of Francisco Franco's internment camps, so she felt a connection with the subject matter. She began extensively researching the events surrounding the round up and discovered survivor Joseph Weismann and Annette Monod whose memories would eventually form the base of the script. Bosch decided to portray only real life characters in the film and cast Gad Elmaleh in the role of Joseph's father, Schmuel Weismann. Initially, Elmaleh was hesitant to accept a serious dramatic role, but after reading the script he agreed to play the role. Actress Mélanie Laurent was cast in the role of the Red Cross worker Annette Monod, whose actions were noble and undisputed, before, during, and after the round up.
Bosch's husband Alain Goldman produced the film.

Shooting began in May 2009 and lasted for 13 weeks. 9,000 extras were used and facsimiles of the Vélodrome d'hiver and a concentration camp were reconstructed in Hungary for the film.

Release
The French premiere took place on 10 March 2010. The film also opened in Belgium, Luxembourg and Switzerland on the same day.

Box office
The Round Up opened in first place in its opening weekend, ranking ahead of Shutter Island at the French box office. In France, it did three million admissions, topping other films on the Holocaust, such as "The Pianist" and "Schindler's List". It then gathered another 7 million viewers on free TV for its first run, becoming the number one French film of the year and appearing in the TF1 polls as the "favorite" film of the audience that year. The DVD remained three weeks in a row at the top of the box office in 2011.

Home media
The DVD of The Round Up was released in France on 7 September 2010. It was released on the American iTunes Store on May 14, 2013.

Critical reception
The film received positive reviews from critics.
Weekly magazine Nouvel Observateur (François Forestier, « La Rafle » [archive], Nouvelobs.com, 2011) says The Round Up is "a courageous film (...), with an extraordinary emotional quality: it is impossible to remain insensitive watching this shameful story. This film honors the French cinema".
Figaroscope (Le Figaro, Top 10 du cinéma, 19 March 2010): 'The director films through the children's eyes ( ... ). Her delicate and meticulous fresco is moving without excess".
Journal du Dimanche (Carlos Gomez): "The emotion goes crescendo, without ostentation and steadily, with dignity".
Paris Match (Alain Spira): "The stars in the film are the children, in all their overwhelming authenticity. To film this tragedy, Rose Bosch is both at a reasonable distance, but gives to her film incredible intensity".
Ouest France: "Impressive, spectacular and gripping." Jean Reno, Sylvie Testud and Melanie Laurent give performances with a sincerity dictated by the subject itself".
L'Express (Emmanuelle Cirodde): "Both 'Schindler's List' and 'The Pianist' were describing lonesome characters. Rose Bosch chooses to describe ordinary people, particularly children".

Other media are less enthusiastic, such as:
Telerama, addressing the question: "Can horror be described?"
On the first French Cinema website, "Allo Ciné" analyzes critics this way: 36% give "5 stars out of 5", 28% allow 4/5 and 7% give no star at all.
In the U.S, Variety ([archive], variety.com, 11 March 2010), says "With impeccable production values and all-around stirring performances, pic emphasizes the unbearable emotions caused by "events, even the most extreme, that actually happened, though it often oversimplifies them into a framework of good vs. evil". Following wide local release March 10, this €20 million ($27 million) co-production should round up ample worldwide biz."
In England, The Guardian (Peter Bradshaw, 2010) says the film is "A straightforward, heartfelt drama about the occupation of France by Nazi Germany".

Controversy
In an interview for the French magazine Les années laser in September 2010, Roselyne Bosch compared people who do not cry at the film to "spoiled children", or cynics who "consider human emotions as an abomination or a weakness", just "like Hitler did". Her remarks were strongly criticized by several French media, and by the cinema website Selenie who accused her of "saying one of the silliest thing[s] of the last few years". Roselyne Bosch sued the website for publicly insulting her, but her case was dismissed in April 2013, the Paris Court judging that the critic did not exceed the boundaries of freedom of expression.

References

External links
 

2010 films
2010s French-language films
French war drama films
French films based on actual events
Films set in France
Films set in Paris
Films set in the 1940s
Films shot in France
Films shot in Hungary
Cultural depictions of Adolf Hitler
Cultural depictions of Heinrich Himmler
Cultural depictions of Philippe Pétain
Holocaust films
The Holocaust in France
Gaumont Film Company films
2010s French films